Abderrahmane Boushita (born 5 September 1997) is a Moroccan judoka. He represented Morocco at the 2019 African Games and won a silver medal in the men's –66 kg category.

He also competed in Men's 66 kg event at the 2017 World Judo Championships, at the 2018 World Judo Championships and at the 2019 World Judo Championships.

At the 2021 African Judo Championships held in Dakar, Senegal, he won one of the bronze medals in the men's 66 kg event.

References

External links
 

1997 births
Living people
Place of birth missing (living people)
Moroccan male judoka
African Games medalists in judo
African Games silver medalists for Morocco
Competitors at the 2019 African Games
Competitors at the 2022 Mediterranean Games
Mediterranean Games competitors for Morocco
20th-century Moroccan people
21st-century Moroccan people